Jüri Pootsmann (born 1 July 1994), is an Estonian singer. He won the sixth season of Eesti otsib superstaari, and represented Estonia in the Eurovision Song Contest 2016 with the song "Play". He is signed to Universal Music Baltics.

Career

2015: Eesti otsib superstaari

In February 2015, Pootsmann took part in the sixth season of Eesti otsib superstaari, an Estonian version of Pop Idol airing on TV3. He won the show on 31 May 2015 when his debut single "Torm" was released. It peaked at number seven in the Estonian Airplay Chart. On 15 November 2015 he released the single "Aga Siis", peaking at number one in the Estonian Airplay Chart. On 20 November 2015, he released his debut self-titled extended play.

Eurovision Song Contest 2016

In 2016, Pootsmann was announced as one of the candidates in the Estonian national selection, Eesti Laul 2016, for the Eurovision Song Contest 2016. On 20 February 2016 Pootsmann performed his song "Play" during the second semi-final of the selection at the Estonian Television studios in Tallinn, and he progressed to the final. The final took place on 5 March 2016 at the Saku Suurhall in Tallinn, hosted by Ott Sepp and Märt Avandi. He reached the Super Final and won the national selection with 32,394 televotes.

During the Eurovision Song Contest, Estonia was drawn into the first semi-final. Pootsmann placed last (18th), Estonia's worst result to date at the contest, and failed to qualify to the final.

Eesti Laul 2021
In 2021, Pootsmann attempted to represent Estonia in the Eurovision Song Contest 2021 with his song "Magus Melanhoolia", placing third in the Superfinal at Eesti Laul, Estonia's national selection final.

Appearances
On 11 March 2016, Pootsmann was featured in the single, "I Remember U," produced by Cartoon. The single peaked at number one in the Estonian Airplay Chart.

Personal life
Pootsmann spent a year on a school exchange in Denmark and is fluent in Danish.

Discography

Albums

Extended plays

Singles

As lead artist

As featured artist

References

1994 births
Living people
People from Rapla Parish
21st-century Estonian male singers
Eurovision Song Contest entrants for Estonia
Eurovision Song Contest entrants of 2016
Estonian expatriates in Denmark
Idols (TV series) winners
Eesti Laul winners